Robert A. Hall was a Massachusetts State Senator who served five terms in the Massachusetts State Senate.

Background and military career
Hall was born in Philadelphia, Pennsylvania in 1946. After graduating from the Collingswood High School in 1964, he joined the Marine Corps. He served four years from 1964 until 1968, when he left the Corps as a Corporal to attend college. He later rejoined the Marine Reserves while in the Massachusetts State Senate, serving from 1977 to 1983 as a radio operator and public information officer. He finally left the Corps in 1983 as a staff sergeant due to time conflicts with his civilian profession after declining a commission as a Second Lieutenant.

Hall received an AA degree from the Mount Wachusett Community College in Gardner, MA in 1970, and a BA degree in Government from the University of Massachusetts Amherst in 1972. While serving in the Massachusetts State Senate, Hall earned a MEd in History from the Fitchburg State College in 1980, attending in the evening.

Political career
He was first elected in 1972, the year he graduated from the University of Massachusetts, by a margin of nine votes out of over 60,000 cast. He was the first Republican elected in what was then the Third Worcester District since 1938. Hall was re-elected in 1974 by a margin of 10,000 votes, carrying every city and town in the heavily Democratic district. In 1976, he was nominated by both parties, winning the Democratic primary on write-in votes against a Leominster City Councilor. He was unopposed in 1978, and easily won reelection in 1980, winning 78% of the vote against a Democrat from Gardner. Hall was appointed Assistant Minority Whip in 1978 and Minority Whip in 1980. Hall worked with members of both parties, and over 60 pieces of legislation he sponsored became law. He retired undefeated in 1982.

Life after politics
After leaving the Massachusetts State Senate, Hall managed several trade associations, serving first as Executive Director of the Florida Psychological Association. From 2002 until 2007, Hall was Executive Director of the American Academy of Cosmetic Dentistry in Madison, Wisconsin. In 2008, he became Executive Director of the American Association of Hip and Knee Surgeons in Rosemont, Illinois. He eventually developed pulmonary fibrosis, an eventually-terminal lung disease. He retired in 2013.

References

External links

1946 births
Living people
Fitchburg State University alumni
Republican Party Massachusetts state senators
United States Marines
Politicians from Philadelphia
United States Marine Corps reservists